The Ray Nkonyeni Local Municipality council consists of seventy-one members elected by mixed-member proportional representation. Thirty-six councillors are elected by first-past-the-post voting in thirty-six wards, while the remaining thirty-five are chosen from party lists so that the total number of party representatives is proportional to the number of votes received. In the election of 3 August 2016 the African National Congress (ANC) won a majority of forty-seven seats on the council.

Results 
The following table shows the composition of the council after past elections.

December 2000 election
The following table shows the results of the 2006 election.

March 2006 election

The following table shows the results of the 2006 election.

May 2011 election

The following table shows the results of the 2011 election.

August 2016 election

The following table shows the results of the 2016 election.

November 2021 election

The following table shows the results of the 2021 election.

By-elections from November 2021
The following by-elections were held to fill vacant ward seats in the period since the election in November 2021.

In a ward 24 by-election, held on 8 March 2023 after the resignation of the ANC councillor, the ANC retained the ward in spite of a large swing to the Inkatha Freedom Party (IFP).

References

uMngeni
Elections in KwaZulu-Natal
Ugu District Municipality